Kevin Greg Wattamaleo (born 25 January 1989) is a Dutch former professional footballer who played as a midfielder.

Career
Wattamaleo started in the youth of Sparta Rotterdam, before making the move to Feyenoord where he made his professional debut on 30 November 2008. He replaced Tim de Cler in the 84th minute of the Eredivisie away match against Vitesse Arnhem (1–1). He played a total of four matches in his first season, after which he joined Eerste Divisie club Excelsior on loan.

With Excelsior's surprising promotion after the season 2009–10, Wattamaleo returned on the highest level, as he signed a two-year deal with the new Eredivisie club. However, he couldn't prevent Excelsior losing the season opening match against De Graafschap (3–0).

After the relegation of Excelsior, at the end of the 2011–12 season, Wattamaleo was released. In November 2012 he signed with NEC until the end of the season.

After one season, in which he played only three matches, Wattamaleo left NEC on a free transfer and signed a two-year contract with FC Volendam.

After six months without a club, Wattamaleo started playing for the reserves of Amsterdamsche FC (AFC) in January 2016, and moved to GLZ Delfshaven in June 2017. He retired from football in July 2018.

Career statistics

References

External links
 Voetbal International profile 

1989 births
Living people
Dutch sportspeople of Surinamese descent
Surinamese people of indigenous peoples descent
Footballers from Rotterdam
Dutch footballers
Association football midfielders
Eredivisie players
Eerste Divisie players
Feyenoord players
Excelsior Rotterdam players